Dictyotrypeta strobelioides is a species of tephritid or fruit flies in the genus Dictyotrypeta of the family Tephritidae.

Distribution
Paraguay, Argentina, Brazil.

References

Tephritinae
Insects described in 1914
Diptera of South America